The Miss Ohio USA competition is the pageant that selects the representative for the state of Ohio in the Miss USA pageant, and the name of the title held by that winner. It has previously been known as Miss Ohio Universe. It is produced by Proctor Productions.

The pageant is currently held in Springfield and has previously been hosted by Mentor, Steubenville and Portsmouth.

Two Ohio representatives, Sue Downey in 1965 and Kim Seelbrede in 1981, have won the Miss USA title and competed in the Miss Universe pageant.

The most notable Miss Ohio USA is actress and Oscar winner Halle Berry, who was 1st runner up at Miss USA 1986. Other notable former titleholders include actress, model and sportscaster Jayne Kennedy and two former Survivor contestants, Kim Mullen of Survivor: Palau and Candace Smith of Survivor: Tocantins. Two Miss Ohio USA titleholders have previously competed at Miss Teen USA. Two have also competed at Miss America. The most recent placement was Sir'Quora Carroll placing 3rd runner-up in 2022.

The current titleholder is Sir'Quora Carroll of Canal Winchester and was crowned on May 21, 2022 at Vern Riffe Center for the Arts in Portsmouth. She represented Ohio for the title of Miss USA 2022, finished as 3rd runner-up.

Gallery of titleholders

Results summary
Miss USAs: Sue Downey (1965), Kim Seelbrede (1981)
1st runners-up: Halle Berry (1986)
2nd runners-up: Audrey Bolte (2012)
3rd runners-up: Kim Weeda (1982), Stacy Offenberger (2006), Sir'Quora Carroll (2022)
4th runners-up: Kathryn Gabriel (1957), Kathleen Kehlmier (1972)
Top 10/12: Melissa Proctor (1990), Melinda Miller (1999), Kristin Smith (2013), Alice Magoto (2019)
Top 15/16: Eleanore Mack (1953), Barbara Randa (1954), Eleanor Wood (1956), Corrine Huff (1960), Gail Krielow (1964), Karen Dietz (1966), Linda Hoyle (1968), Jane Harrison (1970), Megan Wise (2016), Sthephanie Miranda (2020)

Ohio holds a record of 23 placements at Miss USA.

Awards
Miss Photogenic: Kim Thomas (1980)
Miss Congeniality: Monica Day (2008)
Best State Costume: Kim Thomas (1980), Kim Weeda (1982)

Winners

Color key

Notes

References

External links
 

Ohio
Ohio culture
Women in Ohio
Recurring events established in 1952
1952 establishments in Ohio
Annual events in Ohio